The "Prosopa" Greek Television Awards were annual awards about the Greek television. They were the only notable awards in the history of Greek television, since they lasted thirteen years, covering the most successful period of the Greek television. They began in 1997, organised by Tv Ethnos, a magazine issued by the Greek newspaper Ethnos. The last awards were given in 2009. The next years the awards stopped because the productions of Greek television were limited due to Greek debt crisis. The last years the awards were sponsored by telecommunications company WIND Hellas.

The awards included many categories such as best production, best drama series, best comedy series, best actor, best actress, best screenplay, best director, best journalist, best news reader as well as special awards for people with important presence in Greek arts. Many important personalities from the Greek cinema and television have been honoured such as Thanasis Veggos, Alekos Alexandrakis and others.

Best TV Series Director

Best TV Series Screenplay

Best Series

Best TV Series Actor

Best TV Series Actress

Best TV Series Supporting Actor

Best TV Series Supporting Actress

Best TV Series Best Music

References

Greek television awards